The Lost Flowers of Alice Hart is an upcoming seven-part television series produced by Amazon Studios, starring Sigourney Weaver and Alycia Debnam-Carey. It is based on the novel by Australian author Holly Ringland and was adapted for the screen by series showrunner Sarah Lambert. All seven episodes are directed by Glendyn Ivin.

Synopsis
A young girl from a violent upbringing is orphaned and moves in with her grandmother on a flower farm.

Cast
Sigourney Weaver as June Hart 
Alycia Debnam-Carey as Alice Hart 
Alyla Browne as young Alice Hart
Asher Keddie as Sally
Leah Purcell as Twig
Frankie Adams as Candy
Alexander England as John 
Charlie Vickers as Clem Hart
Jack Latorre as young Clem Hart
Tilda Cobham-Hervey as Agnes Hart
Sebastián Zurita
Shareena Clanton as Ruby

Production
In May 2021 it was announced that that Made Up Stories, Amazon Studios and Endeavor Content would produce an adaptation of the book The Lost Flowers of Alice Hart with filming taking place in Australia. Sigourney Weaver was announced as starring
and executive producing, with Sarah Lambert show running and executive producing, Glendyn Ivin as director and executive producer, and Jodi Matterson, Bruna Papandrea, Steve Hutensky and Allie Goss also executive producing. After the announcement Ringland was quoted as saying “This is not anything anyone ever tells you is possible with your first novel..So I feel like Charlie Bucket can move right over and I can confidently say that I am out of the Wonka factory and in the glass elevator. This is not anything I know how to be prepared for, but it is a thrill and a joy.” Filming started in October, 2021 with principal photography in Sydney and the regions of New South Wales and the Northern Territory. It was revealed that Asher Keddie Leah Purcell Alycia Debnam-Carey Frankie Adams, Alexander England, Charlie Vickers, Tilda Cobham-Hervey and Alyla Browne had been added to the cast. In April 2022 it was revealed that Sebastián Zurita had been added to the cast and that Kirsty Fisher and Kim Wilson were on board as co-writers with show runner Lambert with Barbara Gibbs producing and Lucinda Reynolds on board as executive producer. In September 2022 Endeavour Content rebranded as Fifth Season.

Broadcast
Amazon Studios announced the show will be available in over 240 countries and territories through the  streaming service Amazon Prime Video. It is expected to premiere in 2023.

References

External links
 

English-language television shows
Television shows filmed in Australia
Amazon Prime Video original programming
Television shows based on Australian novels
Television series by Amazon Studios
Upcoming drama television series